San Fratello (Gallo-Italic: San Frareau, Sicilian: Santu Frateddu, Greek and Latin: Apollonia, Medieval Latin Castrum S. Philadelphi), formerly San Filadelfo, is a comune (municipality) in the Metropolitan City of Messina in the Italian region Sicily, located about  east of Palermo and about  west of Messina. San Fratello borders the following municipalities: Acquedolci, Alcara li Fusi, Caronia, Cesarò, Militello Rosmarino, Sant'Agata di Militello.

Its peak of population was in 1921, with 10,094. In the following decade, it lost nearly 20 percent of its population, as people migrated for work to cities and to other countries, especially the United States.

History
The name of San Fratello derives from three pious brothers: Alfio, Cirino and Filadelfo. In their honour a festival is held annually on 10 May. The village was founded in the 11th century by Adelaide del Vasto, the wife of Roger I, a noble of present-day French Normandy who conquered Sicily. She came to Sicily together with colonists. They introduced their Gallo-Italic dialect, which is still spoken in the village. San Fratello is one of the so-called Oppida Lombardorum of Sicily, settlements established by the Lombards. In addition to their language, they brought Latin Christianity, which gradually replaced the Greek Byzantine Christianity and Islam.

The territory of the comune is part of the Nebrodi mountains. It has had four major landslides of record. The first was in 1754, and a second large one occurred in 1922. On 1–2 October 2009, the province of Messina suffered devastating, widespread mudslides after a sudden heavy rainstorm; scores of residents died. In February 2010, after a period of large amounts of rain in the Messina region, as a safety precaution, officials evacuated one-third of the population by 14 February. An extensive landslide soon after caused damage to homes in San Fratello and the region.

People 
 Benedict the Moor grew up here, where he joined a Franciscan hermitage.  
 Al Pacino, American actor, is a descendant through his paternal line of immigrants from San Fratello.
 The grandfather of Bettino Craxi, Italian politician, was born here.

See also
 Lombards of Sicily
 Gallo-Italic of Sicily
 Norman conquest of Sicily

References

 
Populated places established in the 11th century
11th-century establishments in Italy